Ušće Lima is a village in the municipality of Višegrad, Bosnia and Herzegovina. The literal meaning of its name is "Mouth of the Lim".

References

Populated places in Višegrad